The Three Brothers are a group of three small coral islands  east of Eagle Islands along the central western rim of the Great Chagos Bank, which is the world's largest coral atoll structure, located in the Chagos Archipelago.

Islands
The individual islands are, from north-west to south-east: 
 North Brother or Île du Nord (6 ha; 15 acres)
 Middle Brother or Île du Milieu (8 ha; 20 acres)
 Resurgent Island (1 ha; 2½ acres)
 South Brother or Île du Sud (23 ha; 57 acres)

History

Discovered by the portuguese, by Vasco da Gama. The islands were known as Bassas de Chagos.
In 1975 during the Joint Services Expedition to Danger Island (JSDI). The expedition members were taken by RFA Resurgent to Eagle Islands and then by ketch and inflatable craft to Danger Island and then to Three Brothers. The expedition made a topographical survey of the coral reefs, an ecological survey of the corals on it and a study on the metabolism of the reef. A reference collection of samples of the flora and fauna of the area was also undertaken. Small, rocky, Resurgent Island emerged after the naming of the Three Brothers and was named after the RFA Resurgent which supported the 1975 Danger Island scientific research expedition to the area.

Since 1998 the islands are part of the Chagos Archipelago Strict Nature Reserve and it is forbidden to land on the islands or anchor a boat nearby.  The islands have large populations of nesting seabirds.

References

External links
World's largest marine reserve created
Joint Services Expedition To Danger Island - (1975) commemorative postcard
Chagos research papers and books
Opisthobranch molluscs from the Chagos Archipelago, Central Indian Ocean

Chagos Archipelago
Nature reserves
Uninhabited islands of the British Indian Ocean Territory